Jalsaghar ( Jalsāghar) is a 1958 Indian Bengali drama film written and directed by Satyajit Ray, based on a popular short story by Bengali writer Tarasankar Bandyopadhyay, and starring Chhabi Biswas. The fourth of Ray's feature films, it was filmed at Nimtita Raajbari, in Nimtita, Aurangabad, Murshidabad. Despite initial poor critical reception in India, Jalsaghar went on to win the Presidential Award for best film in New Delhi, and played a significant role in establishing Ray's international reputation as a director. It has since gained near-universal critical acclaim, and has come to be regarded by the cinema community as one of the greatest films of all time.

Plot
Jalsaghar depicts the end days of a decadent zamindar (landlord) in Bengal and his efforts to uphold his family prestige while facing economic adversity. The landlord, Biswambhar Roy (Chhabi Biswas), is a just but otherworldly man who loves to spend time listening to music and putting up spectacles rather than managing his properties ravaged by floods and the government's abolition of the zamindari system after Independence. He is challenged by a commoner who has attained riches through business dealings, in putting up spectacles and organising music fests. This is the tale of a zamindar who has nothing left but respect and sacrifices his family and wealth trying to retain it.

Cast
 Chhabi Biswas – Biswambhar Roy
 Padma Devi – Mahamaya, Roy's wife
 Pinaki Sen Gupta – Khoka, Roy's son
 Gangapada Bose – Mahim Ganguly, Neighbour
 Tulsi Lahiri – Manager of Roy's estate
 Kali Sarkar – Ananta, Roy's servant
Ustad Waheed Khan – Ustad Ujir Khan, Singer
 Roshan Kumari – Krishna Bai, The dancer
 Begum Akhtar – Durga Bai, Singer

Other credits
 Music & Dance performances
(On screen) – Begum Akhtar, Roshan Kumari, Ustad Waheed Khan, Bismillah Khan
(Off screen) – Dakhshinamohan Thakur, Ashish Kumar, Robin Mazumdar, Imrat Khan, Salamat Ali Khan

Production
Jalsaghar was based on a popular short story written by Bengali writer Tarasankar Bandyopadhyay. After the box office failure of Aparajito, Ray desperately needed a hit film and decided to make a film based on both a popular piece of literature and a film that would incorporate Indian music. It was his first film to extensively incorporate classical Indian music and dancing. Ray began shooting in May 1957.

While in pre-production, Ray and his crew had difficulty finding a suitable location for Biswambhar Roy's palace. By chance they met a man who recommended the palace of Roy Chowdhurys in Nimtita, known as the Nimtita Rajbari and Ray decided to scout the location. To his surprise the palace was not only perfect for the film but just so happened to have once belonged to Upendra Narayan, whom Bandopadhyay had based his main character on when first writing the short story. Ray worked closely with composer Ustad Vilayat Khan on the film, although he was initially uncertain about the composer's musical choices and had to convince Khan to make more sombre music pieces for the film.

According to Ray, "The Nimtita palace was perfect, except that the music room–it did have one, for Ganendra Narayan's uncle Upendra Narayan Choudhury had been a patron of music much like the nobleman in our story–was not impressive enough to serve as the setting for the sumptuous soirées that I had planned." Therefore, the film's famed jalsaghar scenes were made inside the Aurora Film Corporation studio In Maniktala, Kolkata. The studio has now been demolished.

Reception
Although the film received mostly poor reviews in India, it received the Presidential Award in New Delhi for best film. When the film was gradually released in Europe and the US in the early 1960s it became a critical and financial hit and helped establish Ray's international reputation, although Ray said that in 1958 he did not think that the film would be successful in foreign markets. New Statesman film critic John Coleman compared Ray to Jean Renoir and Marie Seton said that the film "challenged the whole convention of songs and dances in India cinema. Audiences...conditioned to the introduction of songs and dances as entertainment interludes and [as] dramatic and romantic stresses, had never before been confronted with...classical singing and dancing as integral focal points of realistic sequences." John Russell Taylor said that the film was "one of Ray's most masterly films, exquisitely photographed and directed with a complete, unquestioning mastery of mood ... For those willing to place themselves under its hypnotic spell it offers pleasures of unique delicacy." Roger Ebert hailed it as "[Ray's] most evocative film, and he fills it with observant details." In 1963 Bosley Crowther praised the "delicacy of direction ... [and] eloquence of Indian music and the aurora of mise en scène." However, that same year Stanley Kauffmann criticised the film, calling it "a deeply felt, extremely tedious film...the Indian music is simply uncongenial and tiresome to our ears." In 1965 Derek Malcolm called it Ray's "most perfect film." When the film was released in Paris in 1981 it was a surprise hit and led many French critics to adopt a new appreciation for Ray that had not been common in France up to that time. San Francisco Chronicle critic Edward Guthmann described it as "A wonderful tale of pride and the fools it makes of men." Werner Herzog said about Jalshaghar "The most amazing Bengali filmmaker Satyajit Ray and there’s one film, really beautiful, it’s called The Music Room... And it’s of phenomenal beauty and Ray really knew how to use music and create a drama around music." Pauline Kael gave the film a rave review writing " great, flawed, maddening film -- hard to take but probably impossible to forget. It's often crude and it's poorly constructed, but it's a great experience. Worrying over its faults is like worrying over whether King Lear is well constructed; it really doesn't matter".

On Rotten Tomatoes, the film has a score of 100% based on 24 reviews with an average rating of 9.09/10.

Box office
In 1981, the film was a box office success in France, where it sold 173,758 tickets, the highest for an Indian film up until Salaam Bombay! (1988).

Awards and recognitions

 1959 – All India Certificate of Merit for the Second Best Feature Film
 1959 – National Film Award for Best Feature Film in Bengali
 Best Music Award at 1st Moscow International Film Festival. Also got a nomination for Grand Pix for Best Film in the festival.
 Widely regarded as one of the greatest films of all time. Voted #20 on the list of "100 Best Films" by the prominent French magazine Cahiers du cinéma in 2008. Was ranked at #27, #146 and #183, respectively, in the Sight and Sound list of Greatest Films in 1992, 2002 and 2012. Film critic Derek Malcolm ranked the film at No. 56 on his list of the "Top 100 Movies" in 2001. The British Film Institute included it in their list of '360 Classics'. The film got the 7th spot (jointly with few other films) on the list of Cinemayas Greatest Asian Films (1998). Recently, Busan International Film Festival featured it at no. 18 (jointly with few other films) in their list of 100 Best Asian Cinema.
 In 2021, The Daily Star ranked the film 3rd on its list of the greatest short story adaptations.

Preservation
The Academy Film Archive preserved Jalsaghar in 1996.

Home video
In 1993, Merchant Ivory Productions restored the film and Sony Pictures Classics released it theatrically in New York with five other Ray films. It was released on VHS in 1995.

In July 2011, an HD digitally restored version of the film was released on DVD and Blu-ray by The Criterion Collection.

Sound Track
A CD of the sound track was released at the end of the 1980's by Ocora-RadioFrance / Harmonia Mundi.
The booklet accompanying the CD contains excerpts of an interview of Satyajit Ray by Andrew Robinson. The interview took place in Calcutta in 1986.
https://archive.org/details/jalsaghar-le-salon-de-musique-sound-track-booklet

References

Further reading

External links
 
The Criterion Collection
The Music Room: Distant Music an essay by Philip Kemp at the Criterion Collection

1958 films
Films directed by Satyajit Ray
Bengali-language Indian films
Films based on short fiction
Indian feudalism
Films set in West Bengal
Films shot in West Bengal
Films with screenplays by Satyajit Ray
Films scored by Vilayat Khan
Second Best Feature Film National Film Award winners
1950s Bengali-language films